Waldenburg may refer to:

Geography
 Waldenburg, Baden-Württemberg, Germany
 Waldenburg, Saxony, Germany
 Waldenburg, Silesia, today Wałbrzych, Poland
 Waldenburg, Switzerland
 Waldenburg, Arkansas, USA
 Bělá pod Pradědem (Waldenburg), Czech Republic

People
 Louis Waldenburg

See also 
 Waldburg
 Wald (disambiguation)
 Waldenberg